Matt Pavelich (born March 12, 1934) is a Canadian retired former National Hockey League ice-hockey linesman, the first to ever be elected to the Hockey Hall of Fame in 1987. After his career as an NHL linesman, Pavelich served as Supervisor of Officials as well as the Director of Player Discipline for the  United Hockey League.

Early career
He began officiating when he was fourteen, working minor hockey games in Sault Ste. Marie, Ontario, and by the time he was twenty years old was referee-in-chief of the Northern Michigan Intermediate League.

Pavelich worked in the American Hockey League in the 1955–56 season but at age twenty-two, he made his National Hockey League début on October 11, 1956.

His older brother Marty Pavelich had been a player with the Detroit Red Wings since 1947 and when the younger Pavelich joined the NHL in 1956, it marked the first time in NHL history that there had been a player/official brother combination.

Career in the NHL
He retired after 23 years and 1,727 regular season games, second only to Neil Armstrong.  He also officiated 245 playoff games, second only to John D'Amico.  He also worked seven Stanley Cup Finals.

After that Pavelich became the NHL's supervisor of officials for referee-in-chief Scotty Morrison.

In 1987, Pavelich was the first linesman inducted into the Hockey Hall of Fame.

On January 24, 1979, Pavelich refereed the first period of the game between the New York Rangers and the Washington Capitals. This was because the scheduled referee for the game Bruce Hood, was unable to make it to the Capital Centre in time, arriving late and taking over the referee chores at the start of the second period.

Pavelich is in his ninth season with the United Hockey League. He served the league as a Supervisor of Officials as well as the Director of Player Discipline for the first half of the 1998–99 season.

See also

 List of Detroit Red Wings players
 List of members of the Hockey Hall of Fame
 List of NHL on-ice officials

References

External links
 

1934 births
Canadian people of Croatian descent
Hockey Hall of Fame inductees
Ice hockey people from Ontario
Living people
National Hockey League officials

Biographical information from https://nhlofficials.com/